Shmatko is a gender-neutral Ukrainian surname that may refer to
Dzmitry Shmatko (born 1989), Belarusian football player
Mykola Shmatko (born 1943), Ukrainian sculptor and painter
Sergei Shmatko (born 1966), Russian businessman and politician 
Polina Shmatko (born 2003), Russian rhythmic gymnast

See also
 

Ukrainian-language surnames